Rebecca W. Rimel was the president and CEO of The Pew Charitable Trusts. She was succeeded in that position on July 1, 2020 by Susan K. Urahn.

Rimel joined the organization in 1983 as a health program manager, and became executive director five years later.  She assumed the position of president and CEO in 1994.

Rimel began her tenure at The Pew Charitable Trusts in 1983, serving as health program manager. Rimel has executive leadership and experience in public policy and advocacy, particularly in the field of healthcare. From 1981 to 1983, she served as an assistant professor in the Department of Neurosurgery at the University of Virginia Health System. She was elected to the American Philosophical Society in 2000.

Education
Rimes earned a bachelor of science degree, with distinction, from the UVA School of Nursing and a Master of Business Administration from James Madison University.

References

External links

Living people
American women chief executives
American nonprofit chief executives
American nurses
American women nurses
University of Virginia School of Nursing alumni
James Madison University alumni
1951 births
Members of the American Philosophical Society
21st-century American women